The Chitral gecko (Mediodactylus walli), also known commonly as the Chitral bow-foot gecko, is a species of lizard in the family Gekkonidae. The species is endemic to Pakistan.

Etymology
The specific name, walli, is in honor of British herpetologist Frank Wall.

Geographic range
M. walli is found in northwestern Pakistan. The type locality is "Chitral, Northwest Frontier Province, Pakistan".

Habitat

Reproduction
M. walli is oviparous.

References

Further reading
Auffenberg K, Krysko KL, Rehman H (2010). "Studies on Pakistan Lizards: Cyrtopodion baturense (Khan and Baig 1992) and Cyrtopodion walli (Ingoldby 1922) (Sauria: Gekkonidae)". Zootaxa 2636: 1–20.
Bauer AM, Masroor R, Titus-McQuillan J, Heinicke MP, Daza JD, Jackman TR (2013). "A preliminary phylogeny of the Palearctic naked-toed geckos (Reptilia: Squamata: Gekkonidae) with taxonomic implications". Zootaxa 3599 (4): 301–324. (Mediodactylus walli, new combination).
Das I (1994). "The reptiles of South Asia: checklist and distributional summary". Hamadryad 19: 15–40.
Ingoldby CM (1922). "A new stone gecko from the Himalaya". Journal of the Bombay Natural History Society 28: 1051. (Gymnodactylus walli, new species).
Khan MS (1992). "Validity of the mountain gecko, Gymnodactylus walli INGOLDBY 1922". Herpetological Journal 2 (4): 106–10.
Sindaco R Jeremčenko VK (2008). The Reptiles of the Western Palearctic. 1. Annotated Checklist and Distributional Atlas of the Turtles, Crocodiles, Amphisbaenians and Lizards of Europe, North Africa, Middle East and Central Asia. (Monographs of the Societas Herpetologica Italica). Latina, Italy: Edizioni Belvedere. 580 pp. . (Altiphylax walli).

Mediodactylus
Reptiles of Pakistan
Reptiles described in 1922